Tweedy may refer to:

Tweedy (surname)
Tweedy (band), an American rock band 
USS Tweedy (DE-532), a U.S. Navy destroyer
Clan Tweedy, a Scottish clan
Tweedy Bird Loc (1967–2020), American rapper
Tweedy the Clown

See also
 Tweedie